Sang-doo! Let's Go to School! is a 2003 South Korean television series starring Rain, Gong Hyo-jin, Lee Dong-gun, Hong Soo-hyun and Song Min-joo. It aired on KBS2 from September 15 to November 4, 2003 Mondays and Tuesdays at 21:50 for 16 episodes.

Synopsis
Cha Sang-doo (Rain) and Chae Eun-hwan (Gong Hyo-jin) were best friends growing up, who secretly have crushes on each other. One day, Eun-hwan's family goes bankrupt and debtors rush to collect their belongings. Eun-hwan tries to reason with a debt collector who is taking her father's old record player, but he takes it anyway. Sang-doo, on his way to walk to school with Eun-hwan, sees the whole thing. He tries to purchase it from the man, but is refused. In a struggle to retrieve the record player, Sang-doo ends up throwing a man off a bridge and putting him in a coma. Sang-doo is sent to prison for assault. After being released from prison, he finds that his parents have disowned him and moved to America and Eun-hwan has run off with her family.

Years pass, and Sang-doo now has a daughter, Cha Bo-ri (Song Min-joo), from a one night stand with Han Se-ra (Hong Soo-hyun). She is sick and diagnosed with leukemia. In order to pay off her hospital bills, Sang-doo becomes a gigolo. His uncle (Lee Young-ha) was a former gigolo and gives him advice on the trade.

One day, he comes across his long-lost first love, Eun-hwan, who is now a high school math teacher in his city. In an effort to regain her love, he returns to high school, first as a security guard and then as a student in her class. Unfortunately, she is engaged to his daughter's doctor, Kang Min-suk (Lee Dong-gun). Min-suk and Sang-doo start off as rivals, vying for Eun-hwan's heart, but later end up as good friends. As everything seems to be going smoothly for Sang-doo and Eun-hwan, circumstances prevent them from staying together.

Cast

Main
Cha Sang-doo – Rain 
Sang-doo is the protagonist of the drama. As a boy, he was charismatic and always popular. One day, he tried to retrieve his first love's cherished possession, but in the process kills a man. His life was turned upside down - he was sent to prison, his parents disowned him, and his first love disappeared. He ends up having a child with Han Se-ra. His daughter Bo-ri has leukemia and to pay her medical bills, he secretly becomes a gigolo with the help of his uncle.

Chae Eun-hwan – Gong Hyo-jin
Eun-hwan has been in love with her childhood best friend since high school, but was separated from him due to her family's financial troubles. As a sign of her devotion to him, she takes care of his dog until the day they reunite.

Kang Min-suk – Lee Dong-gun
Min-suk is Eun-hwan's fiancé and also happens to be Cha Bo-ri's attending physician. Initially, he dislikes Sang-doo and always finds ways to challenge him. Eventually, he gets to know Sang-doo's true character and becomes one of his best friends.

Han Se-ra (aka Pal-ran) – Hong Soo-hyun
Se-ra is a wannabe model. She was abandoned by her birth mother when she was young and has lived on her own ever since. She met Sang-doo at a restaurant and fell in love with him. After giving birth to Bo-ri, she gave her up for adoption because she was unable to pay for her medical bills. Sang-doo retrieves Bo-ri and raises her. Se-ra uses this to stay close to Sang-doo.

Supporting
Song Min-joo as Cha Bo-ri (Sang-doo's daughter)
Lee Young-ha as Cha Man-do (Sang-doo's uncle)
Yeo Seung-hyuk as Chae Ji-hwan (Eun-hwan's brother)
Jeon Hye-bin as Yoon Hee-seo
Shin Goo as Song Jong-doo (principal)
Jung Ae-ri as Gong Shim-ran (Eun-hwan's mother)
Kim Mi-kyung as Sang-doo's teacher
Park Geon-il
Song Ha-yoon

Soundtrack
 세상끝까지
 My Love - Jung Chul
 Beautiful Thing
 난 멈추지 않는다
 내안의 다짐
 Someday
 단념
 내 어린 시절 그 바닷가(연주곡)
 Silver Lining
 Perfectly Numb
 바람속으로
 세상끝까지

Ratings

Awards
2003 KBS Drama Awards
Excellence Award, Actress – Gong Hyo-jin
Best Supporting Actress – Hong Soo-hyun
Best New Actor – Rain
Best Actor in a Comic Role – Lee Young-ha
Best Actress in a Comic Role – Jung Ae-ri
Best Young Actress – Song Min-joo
Netizen Award, Actor – Rain
Netizen Award, Actress – Gong Hyo-jin
Best Couple Award – Rain and Gong Hyo-jin

2004 Baeksang Arts Awards
Most Popular Actor (TV) – Rain

Notes

References

External links
 Sang-doo! Let's Go to School official KBS website (archive) 
 
 

Korean-language television shows
2003 South Korean television series debuts
2003 South Korean television series endings
Korean Broadcasting System television dramas
South Korean romantic comedy television series
Television shows written by Lee Kyung-hee